"I Like the Way She Do It" is the lead single from G-Unit's second album T·O·S (Terminate on Sight), it features Young Buck, as he was no longer a member of G-Unit at the time. The song has since sold over 350,000 copies.

Music video
The music video features 50 Cent, Lloyd Banks and Tony Yayo. The video premiered  on May 12, 2008 on BET's Access Granted. Since Young Buck was released from G-Unit (though still signed to G-Unit Records as a solo artist) he is not featured in the video, and his verse is cut. At the end there is the beginning of the Rider Pt. 2 video.

Critical reception
PrefixMag wrote about how they thought only the beat, produced by Street Radio, would "make this song chart well".
AllHipHop called the song "Down right awful".
HipHopDX also stated that the song was "nothing short of embarrassing".

"I Like the Way She Do It" peaked at #95 on the Billboard Hot 100.

Censorship
In the super clean version of the song, which the music video of it was the premier in BET's Access Granted, the song censors half the song, particularly the chorus with the lines "back into it", "drop it low" and "ass drop", while the normal clean version just censors the word "ass" in the chorus, along with other profanities in the song. Other additional censors in the super clean version are "freak", "rough", "switch [positions]", "hit it", "neck it", and "come up". Some clean versions of the song have an additional censor to the word "retarded", when 50 Cent says he's got "retarded money".

Track listing

Chart performance

References

2008 singles
50 Cent songs
G-Unit songs
Lloyd Banks songs
Tony Yayo songs
Young Buck songs
Music videos directed by Jessy Terrero
Songs written by 50 Cent
Songs written by Tony Yayo
2008 songs
Songs written by Young Buck
Songs written by Lloyd Banks